Kanishtha Dhankar (born 21 September 1988) is an Indian actress and model who was crowned Pantaloons Miss India 2011, where Hasleen Kaur was crowned the Femina Miss India Earth. She later represented India at the Miss World 2011 pageant where she placed in top 30.

Early life
Kanishtha was born on 21 September 1988 at the naval base in Mumbai, India to Raj Singh Dhankhar, a Commodore in the Indian Navy, and Kusum Malhan Dhankhar. She is second of their three children. Her father was posted in Mumbai at the time of her birth. Her mother is a school teacher and a home maker and has worked extensively with the Naval Wives Welfare Association in Mumbai. Her ancestral family is from Haryana. Kanishtha was raised in Colaba, Mumbai. She pursued a Bachelor of Commerce degree in H.R. College of Commerce and Economics in Mumbai.

Career
In 2008, she appeared in Madhur Bhandarkar's film Fashion.

See also
 Femina Miss India
 Miss World 2011

References

External links

 
 

1989 births
Living people
Female models from Mumbai
Femina Miss India winners
Miss World 2011 delegates
Beauty pageant contestants from India
Indian beauty pageant winners